The 141st New York State Legislature, consisting of the New York State Senate and the New York State Assembly, met from January 2 to April 13, 1918, during the fourth year of Charles S. Whitman's governorship, in Albany.

Background
Under the provisions of the New York Constitution of 1894, re-apportioned in 1917, 51 Senators and 150 assemblymen were elected in single-seat districts; senators for a two-year term, assemblymen for a one-year term. The senatorial districts were made up of entire counties, except New York County (twelve districts), Kings County (eight districts), Erie County (three districts) and Monroe County (two districts). The Assembly districts were made up of contiguous area, all within the same county.

In 1917, the Legislature redistricted the Senate seats, and re-apportioned the number of assemblymen per county. Bronx County—which had been part of New York County at the time of the previous apportionment and occupied roughly the area of four Assembly districts—was properly separated, and was apportioned eight seats. New York County (without the Bronx) lost eight seats; and Erie, Jefferson and Ulster counties lost one seat each. Queens County gained two seats; and Broome, Nassau, Richmond, Schenectady and Westchester counties gained one seat each.

At this time there were two major political parties: the Republican Party and the Democratic Party. The Socialist Party and the Prohibition Party also nominated tickets.

Elections
The New York state election, 1917, was held on November 6. The three statewide elective offices up for election were carried by the three incumbents: Attorney General Merton E. Lewis and two cross-endorsed judges of the New York Court of Appeals, viz. Democrat Benjamin N. Cardozo and Republican Chester B. McLaughlin. The approximate party strength at this election, as expressed by the vote for Attorney General, was: Republicans 697,000; Democrats 542,000; Socialists 169,000 and Prohibition 26,000.

Also, a constitutional amendment was adopted by the voters, which gave women the right to vote.

Sessions
The Legislature met for the regular session at the State Capitol in Albany on January 2, 1918; and adjourned on April 13.

Thaddeus C. Sweet (R) was re-elected Speaker, with 88 votes against 33 for Charles D. Donohue (D) and 9 for Abraham I. Shiplacoff (S).

State Senate

Districts
Note: The senators had been elected to a two-year term in November 1916 under the 1907 apportionment, as stated below. Although the Legislature re-apportioned the Senate districts in 1917, the first senatorial election under the new apportionment occurred in November 1918.

Members
The asterisk (*) denotes members of the previous Legislature who continued in office as members of this Legislature.

Note: For brevity, the chairmanships omit the words "...the Committee on (the)..."

Employees
 Clerk: Ernest A. Fay
 Sergeant-at-Arms: Charles R. Hotaling
 Assistant Sergeant-at-Arms: N. B. Sherrill
 Principal Doorkeeper: Lee V. Gardner
 First Assistant Doorkeeper: George W. Van Hyning
 Stenographer: John K. Marshall

State Assembly
Note: For brevity, the chairmanships omit the words "...the Committee on (the)..."

Assemblymen

Employees
 Clerk: Fred W. Hammond
 Sergeant-at-Arms: Harry W. Haines
 Principal Doorkeeper: Charles Furman
 First Assistant Doorkeeper: James B. Hulse
 Second Assistant Doorkeeper: A. H. Bunnell
 Stenographer: Samuel Bruckheimer
Committee Clerk: Wilson Messer
Postmaster: James H. Underwood

Notes

Sources
 Journal of the Senate (140th Session) (1918; Vol. I, from January 2 to April 1)
 Journal of the Assembly (141st Session) (1918; Vol. I, from January 2 to March 18)
 GUIDE FOR VOTERS BY CITIZENS UNION in NYT on October 28, 1917
 LEGISLATORS ELECTED in NYT on November 7, 1917
 TEN SOCIALISTS IN THE ASSEMBLY in NYT on November 8, 1917

141
1918 in New York (state)
1918 U.S. legislative sessions